I Wouldn't Be in Your Shoes is a 1948 American film noir directed by William Nigh, starring Don Castle and Elyse Knox. It was based on a novel of the same name by Cornell Woolrich with a screenplay by fellow pulp writer Steve Fisher.

Plot
Vaudeville dancer Tom Quinn (Castle) and his wife Ann are barely getting by on her job at a dance hall. He anxiously awaits her return from work, as she is often delayed by a heavy tipping customer she calls "Santa Claus" who turns out to be a police detective (Clint Judd). Depressed and anxious, Tom impulsively throws his only shoes at howling cats outside his window, which he is unable to find even though he immediately searches for them. They mysteriously reappear outside the apartment door the next morning. A reclusive neighbor known to have a large stash of old large size currency is found murdered, and Tom's shoe prints are found at the scene. Even worse, he had found a wallet containing several thousand dollars in such bills on the street at a place he frequented, so he is quickly convicted for the crime and sentenced to death. His wife implores Judd to find the real killer and he follows several leads to no avail. Ann soon realizes Judd had been in love with her all along and committed the murder and framed Tom in an attempt to win her.

Cast
 Don Castle as Tom J. Quinn 
 Elyse Knox as Ann Quinn 
 Regis Toomey as Inspector Clint Judd 
 Charles D. Brown as Inspector Stevens 
 Rory Mallinson as Harry, 1st Detective 
 Robert Lowell as John L. Kosloff 
 Steve Darrell as District Attorney
 Bill Kennedy as 2nd Detective
 John Doucette as a Prisoner
 Ray Teal as a Guard

References

1948 films
1948 crime films
American crime films
American black-and-white films
1940s English-language films
Film noir
Monogram Pictures films
Films based on American novels
Films directed by William Nigh
Films produced by Walter Mirisch
Films based on works by Cornell Woolrich
1940s American films